NUMAlink is a system interconnect developed by Silicon Graphics (SGI) for use in its distributed shared memory ccNUMA computer systems. NUMAlink was originally developed by SGI for their Origin 2000 and Onyx2 systems. At the time of these systems' introduction, it was branded as "CrayLink" during SGI's brief ownership of Cray Research.

Hewlett Packard Enterprise entered an original equipment manufacturer (OEM) arrangement with Silicon Graphics International (SGI) to use Numalink as the foundation in some mission critical servers.

NUMAlink 2 
There was no NUMAlink 1, as SGI's engineers deemed the system interconnect used in the Stanford DASH to be the first generation NUMAlink interconnect. 
NUMAlink 2 (branded as CrayLink) was announced in October 1996 for the Onyx2 visualization systems, the Origin 200 and the Origin 2000 servers and supercomputers. The NUMAlink 2 interface is the Hub ASIC. NUMAlink 2 is capable of 1.6 GB/s of peak bandwidth through two 800 MB/s, PECL 400 MHz 16-bit unidirectional links.

NUMAlink 3 

NUMAlink 3 is the third generation of the interconnect, introduced in 2000 and used in the Origin 3000 and Altix 3000. NUMAlink 3 is capable of 3.2 GB/s of peak bandwidth through two 1.6 GB/s unidirectional links.
The name NUMAflex reflects the modular design approach around this time.

NUMAlink 4 

NUMAlink 4 is the fourth generation of the interconnect, introduced in 2004 and used in the Altix 4000. NUMAlink 4 is capable of 6.4 GB/s of peak bandwidth through two 3.2 GB/s unidirectional links.

NUMAlink 5 

NUMAlink 5 is the fifth generation of the interconnect, introduced in 2009 and used in the Altix UV series. NUMAlink 5 is capable of 15 GB/s of peak bandwidth through two 7.5 GB/s unidirectional links.

NUMAlink 6 

NUMAlink 6 is the sixth generation of the interconnect, introduced in 2012 and used in the SGI UV 2000, SGI UV 3000, SGI UV 30. NUMAlink 6 is capable of 6.7 GB/s of bidirectional peak bandwidth for up to 256 socket system and 64TB of coherent shared memory.

NUMAlink 7 

NUMAlink 7 is the seventh generation of the interconnect, introduced in 2014 and used in the HPE Integrity MC990 X/SGI UV 300, SGI UV 30EX, SGI UV 300H, SGI UV 300RL. NUMAlink 7 is capable of 14.94 GB/s of bidirectional peak bandwidth for up to 64 socket system and 64TB of coherent shared memory.

NUMAlink 8 (Flex ASIC) 

NUMAlink 8 is the eighth generation of the interconnect, introduced in 2017 and used in the HPE Superdome Flex. NUMAlink 8 is capable of 853.33 GB/s of bisection peak bandwidth(64 links are cut) for up to 32 socket system and 48TB of coherent shared memory.

See also

 List of device bit rates
 InfiniBand
 RapidIO
 Myrinet
 Scalable Coherent Interconnect
 QsNet II
 QuickRing

References 

 Joseph Heinrich, Origin and Onyx2 Theory of Operations Manual, 007-3439-002, Silicon Graphics.

External links 
 HPE NUMAlink servers, Superdome Flex.
 
 

Silicon Graphics